The Baiswar are a Hindu caste found in the state of Uttar Pradesh, Madhya Pradesh, India. They are Sub-clan of Bais Rajput and divided into two Clans Khandit and Bansit. Basically Baiswar people are scion of BAIS RAJPUT. 

They are migrated from baiswara after the attcak of other bais rajput kingdom & these are shifted into under chandel kingdom.They called them Baiswar due to migration from Baiswara. 

The 2011 Census of India for Uttar Pradesh showed the Baiswar population as 17,920.

References

Scheduled Castes of Uttar Pradesh